Ramalina ketner-oostrae is a species of saxicolous (rock-dwelling), fruticose lichen in the family Ramalinaceae. It is found in the remote tropical island of Saint Helena, where it occurs on cliffs. It was formally described as a new species in 2008 by Dutch lichenologist André Aptroot. The branches are thin, flattened, papery, and fan-shaped (flabellate) in outline, lacking pseudocyphellae. Thin-layer chromatography shows that the species contains usnic acid and usually also norstictic acid and connorstictic acid. The photobiont partner is dispersed in irregular groups throughout the medulla. The species epithet honours Dutch lichenologist and ecologist Rita Ketner-Oostra.

References

External links
 Pictures of Tropical Lichens – Image of species 

ketner-oostrae
Lichen species
Lichens described in 2008
Taxa named by André Aptroot
Lichens of the middle Atlantic Ocean